The Honourable Frederick Hamilton ( – 1715) was an Irish politician who represented Donegal County in three Irish parliaments. He was also heir apparent to his father, Gustavus Hamilton, 1st Viscount Boyne. He predeceased him but his son succeeded as the 3rd viscount.

Birth and origins 

Frederick was born before 1686 in Ireland. He was the eldest son of Gustavus Hamilton and his wife Elizabeth Brooke. His father would in 1715 be ennobled as Baron Stackallan and in 1717 advanced to Viscount Boyne. His father's family was a Protestant cadet branch of the House of Hamilton. 

Frederick's mother was the eldest daughter of Sir Henry Brooke by his second wife, Anne St George. Brooke was knight of Brookeborough, County Fermanagh, and governor of Donegal Castle. Frederick had two brothers and one sister, who are listed in his father's article.

First term as MP 
During the 1st Irish Parliament of Queen Anne (21 September 1703 – 6 May 1713), Hamilton became a member of parliament (MP) by winning the 1707 by-election for one of the two seats for Donegal County. This by-election resulted from the death of the incumbent Henry Conyngham, in January 1706 in the Battle of St Estevan of the War of the Spanish Succession (1701–1714). Hamilton's father already held the other of the two seats of the constituency.

Marriage and children 
On 1 September 1707, Hamilton married Sophia Hamilton, daughter of James Hamilton of Tollymore, near Newcastle, County Down, and sister of James Hamilton, 1st Earl of Clanbrassil of the second creation.

 
Frederick and Sophia had two sons:
Gustavus (1710–1746), succeeded his grandfather as the 2nd Viscount Boyne
James (died 1740), a lieutenant in the navy

—and two daughters:
Anne (born 1712), died young
Elizabeth (born 1715), died young

Vice-admiral of Ulster 
In 1710 Hamiltion became vice-admiral of Ulster when his father passed this office to him. Hamilton then held it until his death in 1710 when it reverted to his father. This office was a sine cure as Ireland had no navy.

Second term as MP 
Hamilton was again elected as MP for County Donegal in the Irish general elections held in 1713 for the second Irish parliament of Queen Anne (1713–1714). This parliament was dissolved by the queen's death.

Honourable 
On 20 October 1715, his father was created Baron Hamilton of Stackallan. As son of a peer Hamilton acquired the style "The Honourable".

Third term as MP 
In November 1715 Hamilton was elected for a last time as MP, again for County Donegal, in the general election for the only Irish parliament of King George I. That parliament lasted from 12 November 1715 to 11 June 1727, but Frederick died on 10 December 1715, after not even a month's service. He was replaced by his younger brother Gustavus.

Death, succession, and timeline 
Hamilton died on 10 December 1715, predeceasing his father, who would die in 1723, and his mother, who would die in 1721. At the time of Frederick's death his father had just been ennobled as Baron Stackallan and was not yet Viscount Boyne. Hamilton therefore was an heir apparent without a courtesy title as his father had no subsidiary title. His father was succeeded by Frederick's son Gustavus as the 2nd Viscount Boyne.

See also 
 List of parliaments of Ireland

Notes and references

Notes

Citations

Sources 

  (for Boyne)
  – Ab-Adam to Basing (for Family tree)
  – Bass to Canning (for Boyne)
  – 1689 to 1694
  – Scotland and Ireland
  – (for timeline)
  (for MP of Donegal County)
  – Viscounts (for Boyne)

1670s births
1715 deaths
Heirs apparent who never acceded
Irish MPs 1703–1713
Irish MPs 1713–1714
Members of the Parliament of Ireland (pre-1801) for County Donegal constituencies
Members of the Privy Council of Ireland